R Leonis Minoris  (R LMi) is a Mira variable type star in the constellation Leo Minor. It ranges between apparent magnitude 6.3 and 13.2, and spectral types M6.5e to M9.0e (Tc:),  over a period of 372 days.

References 

Mira variables
084346
Leonis Minoris, R
Leo Minor
M-type giants
047886
Durchmusterung objects
Emission-line stars